Melissa Dixon (29 August 1923 –  26 October 2015), credited as Peg Dixon, was a Canadian actress. She was best known for her voice acting in Spider-Man. She was married to Ed McNamara.

She was also in an episode with Rob Paulsen.

Selected filmography

References

External links
 

1923 births
2015 deaths
Canadian television actresses
Canadian voice actresses